Iresh Zaker (born 6 November 1976) is a Bangladeshi advertising executive, television and film actor and a musician. He is the managing director of Asiatic 360, a marketing and advertising company, owned and operated by his parents, actors Aly Zaker and Sara Zaker. Most of Iresh Zaker's work as an actor has been in television, but he has also played negative roles in several films. He won the National Film Awards Best Performance in a Negative Role in 2015 for his portrayal of antagonist Danny in Chuye Dile Mon.

Early life
Zaker was born on 6 November 1976 to actors Aly Zaker and Sara Zaker. He spent his early childhood with his younger sister Sriya Sharbojoya in Bangladesh. He completed his initial schooling from Scholastica in Dhaka in 1994. After that, he went to the United States and enrolled at Grinnell College, in Iowa. Then he moved to Wisconsin and graduated from Lawrence University in 2000. Two years later he finished his master's degree in development economics from the University of Illinois at Urbana–Champaign.

Personal life 
Zaker married Meem Rashid in 2018. Meem is the sister of actor Rafiath Rashid Mithila.

Career
In his education life, he and some of his friends formed the musical group Cryptic Fate which became popular, but he later left the band.

After completion of his graduation, he got a job in the United States and planned his future there. After some years, however, he returned to Bangladesh. At first he worked as a voice artist, doing radio dramas, documentaries, and commercials. He did a voice-over for Sisimpur, the popular Bangladeshi version of the children's television series Sesame Street.

He  debuted as a television actor in 2006 as Shahed in the single-episode TV play Batasher Khacha, with his father, Aly Zaker, playing his on-screen father. In 2012, he debuted on the big screen in the film Chorabali, directed by Redoan Rony. He won the 2015 National Film Awards Best Performance in a Negative Role for his portrayal of antagonist Danny in Chuye Dile Mon, produced by his mother, Sara Zaker.

As well as his TV and film work, Zaker is Group managing director of Asiatic 360 (his family's marketing and communication company) and a director of Radio Shadhin, one of the Asiatic Group companies.

Filmography

Films

Television

Web series

Awards
 2015 National Film Awards Bangladesh National Film Award for Best Performance in a Negative Role for Chuye Dile Mon

See also
Cryptic Fate

References

External links
 

Living people
21st-century Bangladeshi male actors
Bangladeshi male film actors
1976 births
Best Performance in a Negative Role National Film Award (Bangladesh) winners